Lael Brainard (born January 1, 1962) is an American economist serving as the 14th director of the National Economic Council since February 21, 2023. She previously served as the 22nd vice chair of the Federal Reserve between May 2022 and February 2023. Prior to her term as vice chair, Brainard served as a member of the Federal Reserve Board of Governors, taking office in 2014. Before her appointment to the Federal Reserve, she served as the under secretary of the treasury for international affairs from 2010 to 2013.

The daughter of an American diplomat, Brainard was born in Hamburg and spent her childhood in West Germany and Poland. She graduated from Wesleyan University in 1983 and received a PhD from Harvard University in 1989 as a National Science Foundation Fellow. She was a professor at the Massachusetts Institute of Technology for six years before joining the Clinton administration as an economic advisor in 1997. She then worked as a senior fellow at the Brookings Institution from 2001 to 2009.

Brainard was nominated by Barack Obama to serve as the Under Secretary of the Treasury for International Affairs at the Department of the Treasury on March 23, 2009. She was confirmed to the position by a 78–19 vote in the U.S. Senate on April 20, 2010, and was sworn in on the same day. She tendered her resignation on November 8, 2013, amid indicators in the professional community that she would be a viable nominee to the Fed board.

Following the resignation of Elizabeth Ashburn Duke, Brainard was nominated to the Fed board on January 13, 2014, alongside Stanley Fischer and Jerome Powell. She was confirmed by a 61–31 vote in the U.S. Senate on June 12, 2014; her 14-year term began when she was sworn in four days later. She now serves as administrative governor and chair of four committees: Financial Stability; Federal Reserve Bank Affairs; Consumer and Community Affairs; and Payments, Clearing and Settlements.

During the 2020 presidential transition of Joe Biden, Brainard had been viewed by media outlets as an early frontrunner to be Secretary of the Treasury, though Janet Yellen was chosen instead.

President Biden nominated Brainard to serve as Vice Chair of the Federal Reserve on November 22, 2021, succeeding Richard Clarida in the role. On April 26, 2022, her nomination as Federal Reserve Vice Chair was confirmed by the U.S. Senate. She was sworn in on May 23, 2022. In February 2023, Biden announced Brainard as Brian Deese's successor as Director of the National Economic Council. She resigned her positions as Federal Reserve governor and Vice Chair on February 18, 2023.

Early life and education
Lael Brainard, daughter of the U.S. foreign-service officer and diplomat Alfred Brainard, grew up in West Germany and later Poland in the period before the Revolutions of 1989 and the Fall of the Berlin Wall. She graduated with university honors from Wesleyan University with a bachelor of arts degree from the College of Social Studies. Brainard received masters and doctoral degrees in economics from Harvard University, where she was a National Science Foundation Fellow.

She is the recipient of a White House Fellowship and a Council on Foreign Relations International Affairs Fellowship. She received the Alexander Hamilton Award for her service at the Department of the Treasury and was awarded the Harvard GSAS Centennial Medal and the New York Association of Business Economics William F. Butler Award in 2019.

Career

Private sector
Brainard started her career at McKinsey & Company advising corporate clients on strategic challenges.

Brainard served as Assistant and Associate Professor of Applied Economics at the MIT Sloan School of Management from 1990 to 1996 where her publications made important contributions on the relationship between offshore production, trade, and jobs; the measurement of structural and cyclical unemployment in the U.S. economy; and strategic trade policy.

Brainard was a senior fellow at the Brookings Institution from 2001 to 2009 and Vice President and Director of the Global Economy and Development Program from 2006 to 2009.

White House
Beginning in 1997 Brainard served as deputy national economic advisor and deputy assistant to the president during the Clinton administration.  In this role, she was the White House staff coordinator for the Asia-Pacific Economic Cooperation (APEC) Leaders Meeting in Vancouver and Manila; responsible for the President's three-year review of NAFTA; and for preparing the way for China’s entry into the  WTO. She was also responsible for the G7/G8 Jobs Conferences in the U.K. and France, and took part in President Clinton's visits to China, Latin America, the U.K., and the Summit of the Americas held in Miami.

As deputy director of the National Economic Council, she helped build a new White House organization to address global economic challenges such as the Asian financial crisis and China's accession to the World Trade Organization. As the U.S. Sherpa to the G8, she helped shape the 2000 G8 summit that, for the first time, included leaders of the poorest nations and laid the foundations for the Global Fund to Fight AIDS, Tuberculosis and Malaria.

Treasury 

On March 23, 2009, President Obama nominated Brainard to serve as Under Secretary of the Treasury for International Affairs. Reuters News Service reported on December 23, 2009, that the Senate Finance Committee had approved Brainard to become the "Treasury Department's top global diplomat, a job that would give her a key role in the bid to push China toward a flexible currency". The Senate confirmed her in a 78–19 vote on April 20, 2010. Brainard managed the Office of International Affairs at the Treasury Department with responsibilities including the euro area crisis and currency relations with China. In this role, she exerted pressure on China to allow the forces of the free market to guide its currency. She also pressured Europe to follow a stronger economic rescue plan during the sovereign-debt crisis.

During this time, she was the U.S. Representative to the G-20 Finance Deputies and G-7 Deputies and was a member of the Financial Stability Board. She received the Alexander Hamilton Award for her service. She left her post in the U.S. Treasury in November 2013.

Federal Reserve Board

Brainard was nominated to the Federal Reserve Board of Governors by President Barack Obama in January 2014. She was confirmed by the Senate by a vote of 61–31 on June 12, 2014, and began her term on June 16, 2014. Brainard serves as Administrative Governor, Chair of the Committee on Financial Stability, the Committee on Federal Reserve Bank Affairs, the Committee on Consumer and Community Affairs, the Committee on Payments, Clearing and Settlements, and the Subcommittee on Smaller Regional and Community Banking Organizations.

Vice Chair of the Federal Reserve

On November 22, 2021, President Joe Biden nominated Brainard to be the vice-chair of the Federal Reserve.  Her initial nomination was returned to President Biden on January 3, 2022, due to it expiring at the end of the year. President Biden renominated her the following day.

Hearings were held on Brainard's nomination before the Senate Banking Committee on January 13, 2022. The committee favorably reported her nomination to the Senate floor on March 16, 2022 in a 16-8 vote. On April 25, 2022, the United States Senate invoked cloture on her nomination by a 54-40 vote. On April 26, 2022, her nomination was confirmed by the Senate by a 52-43 vote, with all Democrats present and seven Republicans voting in favor of her confirmation. She became just the third woman to serve as Fed's Vice Chair, following Alice Rivlin and Janet Yellen.

National Economic Council
In February 2023, Biden selected Brainard as Director of the National Economic Council, replacing Brian Deese. She is the second woman to serve as NEC Director, following Laura Tyson.

Publications
Brainard is co‑editor of Climate Change and Global Poverty: A Billion Lives in the Balance (2009); co-editor of Too Poor For Peace? (2007); co-editor of Offshoring White Collar Work (2006); editor of Transforming the Development Landscape: the Role of the Private Sector (2006) and Security by Other Means: Foreign Assistance, Global Poverty and American Leadership (2006); and co-author of The Other War: Global Poverty and the Millennium Challenge Corporation (2004).

References

External links

 Federal Reserve Biography
 Statements and Speeches of Lael Brainard
 

|-

|-

|-

1962 births
Living people
21st-century American economists
21st-century American women
American women economists
Biden administration personnel
George School alumni
Harvard University alumni
McKinsey & Company people 
MIT Sloan School of Management faculty
National Bureau of Economic Research
Obama administration personnel
Trump administration personnel
United States Department of the Treasury officials
Vice Chairs of the Federal Reserve
Wesleyan University alumni